Derbi is a manufacturer of motorcycles, scooters, mopeds and recreational all-terrain vehicles produced by Nacional Motor S.A.U., a Spanish subsidiary of Piaggio & Co. SpA.

History
Derbi's origins began with a little bicycle workshop in the village of Mollet near Barcelona, founded in 1922 by Simeó Rabasa i Singla (1901–1988). The focus remained the repair and hire of bicycles until May 1944 when Rabasa formed a 
limited liability company named Bicycletas Rabasa with the aim of moving into manufacturing bicycles. The venture proved very successful and in 1946, supported by its profits, work began on a motorised version. More moped than motorcycle, this first model, the 48cc SRS included plunger rear suspension, and a motorcycle type gas tank and exhaust system. The SRS proved so successful it prompted a change in the company's direction, and on November 7, 1950, the company changed its name to the Nacional Motor SA. Just prior to this, at that summer's Barcelona Trade Fair, the company unveiled its first real motorcycle, the Derbi 250.

First win in 1968 with Barry Smith at TT race, Derbi successfully competed in Grand Prix motorcycle racing, winning 50cc world championships in 1969, 1970 and 1972. When the 50cc class was increased to an 80cc displacement in 1984, Derbi would claim four consecutive world championships between 1986 and 1989, before the class was discontinued in Grand Prix competition. The firm also experienced racing success in 125cc Grand Prix competitions, winning world championships in 1971, 1972, 1988, 2008 and 2010. The Derbi RSA 125 earned 405 points in the constructor's championship in the 125cc class. The 405 points in 2010 are second only to Aprilia which earned 410 points in 2007.

Modern history

Unlike Ossa, Bultaco, and Montesa, Derbi successfully met the challenges that followed the Spanish transition to democracy and Spain's entry into the European Community. Simeó Rabasa i Singla died in 1988 but the company remained independent until 2001, when it was bought out by the Piaggio group.

The Derbi name
The name Derbi is an acknowledgement of the company's history, and is an amalgamation from the Catalan-phrase Derivats de BIcicletes (derivatives of bicycles).

Past Models
Pedal Mopeds
Derbi Variant SL
Derbi Variant SLE
Derbi Variant TT
Derbi Variant Sport
Derbi DS50, step through scooter
Derbi Diablo C4, enduro styling
Derbi Diablo C5, enduro styling (using the Variant engine and transmission)
Derbi RD50,  enduro styling (using the Variant engine and transmission)
Derbi Laguna, road styling (some models using the Variant engine and transmission)
Derbi Laguna Sport

Road
 Derbi GPR 125 2T
 Derbi T 250 6V

Scooters
 Derbi Manhattan
 Derbi Hunter
 Derbi Predator
 Derbi Paddock

Current Models

Road
 Derbi GPR 50
 Derbi GPR 50 Nude
 Derbi GPR 125 4T 4V
 Derbi Cross City 125
 Derbi Etx 150
 Derbi Stx 150
 Derbi Mulhacén 125
 Derbi Mulhacén Café 125
Supermoto

 Derbi Senda 50
 Derbi Senda X-Race/X-Treme 50
 Derbi Senda 125 4T SM
 Derbi Mulhacén 659
  Derbi Terra Adventure 125

Scooters
 Atlantis
 Boulevard
 GP1
Bullet

References

External links

 

 
Moped manufacturers
Motorcycle manufacturers of Spain
Piaggio Group
Spanish brands